Cipangopaludina malleata is a species of large, freshwater snail with an operculum and a gill, an aquatic gastropod mollusk in the family Viviparidae, the river snails.

Originally from Japan, C. malleata has been introduced to various areas along the Pacific coast of North America.

Description
The shell is described as thin and "egg-shaped" with very rounded whorls. The spire is short, and the apex may become worn out in older specimens. The name malleatus derives from Latin malleāre (to hammer) and refers to the "hammered-like sculpture" often found on the shell of this species.

References

External links

Viviparidae